Ákos Takács (born 14 February 1982) is a Hungarian former professional football player, who last played for Győri ETO FC. He has played four times for the Hungarian national team and scored one goal.

Playing career
Takács started his career for Hungarian clubs Goliát FC, BVSC and Vasas SC. In 2002, he moved to Hungarian champions Ferencvárosi TC. His stay in Ferencváros was cut short in 2006 due to the club's financial difficulties. This resulted in a relegation of the club to the Hungarian second division on 25 July 2006. All player contracts were annulled, and Takács was able to move from the club on a free transfer. After a successful trial in Danish club Vejle Boldklub, he signed a 3-year contract on 15 August 2006.

Takács arrived in Vejle Boldklub during a low point where, after gaining promotion to the Danish Superliga, the club had lost their first five matches with the score 4-15. He debuted against Danish champions FC Copenhagen on the right-back, the fourth player in six matches to play that position. He played eight matches in a row, but suffered an injury in October 2006. After Ove Christensen replaced Kim Poulsen as manager of Vejle Boldklub in April 2007, Takács only played two matches for the club's first team, his last match being the 2-3 defeat against Odense Boldklub on 9 April 2007. On 12 November 2007 Takács and Vejle Boldklub cancelled their contract.

International goals
Scores and results list Hungary's goal tally first.

References

External links
Budapest Honvéd FC Official website

Living people
1982 births
Footballers from Budapest
Hungarian footballers
Hungary international footballers
Vasas SC players
Ferencvárosi TC footballers
Vejle Boldklub players
Budapest Honvéd FC players
Győri ETO FC players
Hungarian expatriate footballers
Expatriate men's footballers in Denmark
Hungarian expatriate sportspeople in Denmark
Association football defenders